Ripuarian or Rhineland Franks (Latin: Ripuarii or Ribuarii) were one of the two main groupings of early Frankish people, and specifically it was the name eventually applied to the tribes who settled in the old Roman territory of the Ubii, with its capital at Cologne on the Rhine river in modern Germany. Their western neighbours were the Salii, or "Salian Franks", who were named already in late Roman records, and settled with imperial permission within the Roman Empire in what is today the southern part of the Netherlands, and Belgium, and later expanded their influence into the northern part of France above the Loire river, creating the Frankish empire of Francia.

Both the Salii and Ripuarii were new names and represented new groupings of older tribal groups on the Roman Rhine border. The ancestors of the Ripuarii originally lived on the right bank of the Rhine, where there had been a long history of friendly and unfriendly contact. Under pressure from their northern enemies, the Saxons, they were first able to infiltrate the left bank of the Rhine in 274 AD. In the chaotic years after the definitive collapse of Roman power in western Europe, they managed to occupy the Roman city of Cologne and the lower and middle Rhineland in present-day North Rhine-Westphalia.

Few historical details are known before the Rhineland kingdom eventually became an important part of the Merovingian Frankish empire in the sub-kingdom known as Austrasia, which also included the original Germanic speaking Salian region. Austrasia included not only the Rhineland-Palatinate, but apparently the whole of the Germania Inferior (re-named in the late Roman empire as Germania II) and Gallia Belgica II. The border between Austrasia and Neustria was the Silva Carbonaria in modern Wallonia, but the exact definition of this forest region is now unclear.

On the right bank of the Rhine, the Ripuarian Franks had control over the river basin of the Main, in later years also called Franconia, one of the five stem duchies, from which in the middle of the 9th century the kingdom of Germany was formed.

In the 7th century a law code for Austrasia was published as the Lex Ripuaria. After the reign of the last capable Salian Frankish king, Dagobert I in 639, the Carolingian Austrasian mayordomos gradually took over power, transforming Austrasia into the heartland of the Carolingian Empire.

Name
The name Ripuarii clearly has a meaning of "river people", but the exact way in which the name developed is unclear and may have involved both Latin and Germanic.

The regular Latin form would be Riparii, meaning "[men] of the river bank". The term "milites rip(ari)ensis" was a Latin term used for border soldiers on river frontiers, at least on the Danube and Rhône. Jordanes referred to soldiers described this way from Gaul, fighting under Aetius, but Eugen Ewig has argued that these soldiers can be found in the Notitia Dignitatum based on the Rhône river. In the 7th century, the country around Cologne was described as "ripa Rheni", and so it seems clear that the Latin word for a riverbank was sometimes used to describe the region.

The form Ripuarii is irregular, however, and has been explained by a hypothetical native (Germanic) name underlying the Latin. 
This hypothetical self-designation might be restored as either *hreop-waren, *hrepa-waren "river[-bank] people". or *hreop-wehren, *hrepa-wehren "river[-bank] defenders".

Conversely, the form Ripuarii may also be due to a loan of the Latin Riparii into Germanic. This view is based on a word-pair given in the Summarium Heinrici, an 11th-century revision of Isidore of Seville, stating the Old High German equivalents of some Latin words, including Ripuarii: Riphera. The latter is textually reconstructed to *ripfera, except that "phonetically *ripf- cannot come from rip-;"

A third possibility is that the name Ripuarii was a mixed word to begin with, perhaps *ripwarjoz. It seems to be analogous to the later formation, Ribuarius, in which Gallo-Roman *ribbar replaces Roman ripa. From the Gallo-Roman came the French rive, "bank," and a group of words based on it.

History
The term Franks first appears in the 3rd century on the right bank of the Rhine. Tribes who had lived in the same area in Roman times included the Sicambri, Chamavi, Bructeri, Chattuarii, and Tencteri. The Franks replaced those older tribes in the record and most probably represent a new alliance of all or some of them.

These independent Franks crossed the Rhine frequently to establish bases there from which they raided further into the Roman empire. The Romans eventually bought peace by exchanging freedom to settle on the left bank for cooperation in maintaining the peace. Many of these Franks rose to high office in the empire.

In the area of the Ripuarii, the Rhine had been defined as a border of the Roman empire under the early emperors. The Romans created two provinces: Upper and Lower Germany. The dividing line was marked and maintained by a major base at Mainz. Lower Germany, which faced the Ripuarii, later became Germania Secunda. Roman cities in this region included Castra Vetera (Xanten), Cologne, and Bonn.

Long before the Franks, the Romanized Ubii had been the main Germanic people within the region of Cologne since early Roman imperial times. They had been allowed to move from the other side of the Rhine. Colonia Agrippinenses (Cologne) was placed among them as a Roman colony to assist them "keep the gate against intruders." While the Ubii had moved under pressure from the Suebi to their east, other related tribes under similar pressure from more distant neighbours had moved in to replace them on the right bank of the Rhine, including the Bructeri, Tencteri, Sicambri and Usipetes. These remained in contact with the province of the Ubii, as is described by Tacitus concerning the Batavian revolt. It is thought that all of these relatively Romanized Germanic tribes may have contributed to the origins of the Ripuarii in later centuries.

The Ripuarian Franks lost their independence almost as soon as they entered the historical record, being subsumed in the Frankish core province of Austrasia. Apart from Roman military lists and mention by Jordanes in Getica of some unknown Ripuarii who fought as auxiliaries of Flavius Aetius in the Battle of Chalons in 451, the first mention of the Ripuarii comes from Gregory of Tours, in Historia Francorum. He says that the Salian Frank Clovis, first king of all the Franks and first king to convert to Christianity, subjected the previously independent Ripuarians. Without naming the people as Ripuarian, but referring to Cologne and its vicinity, Gregory of Tours explains how they voluntarily gave up their sovereignty to Clovis. The region of Cologne was under the rule of Sigobert the Lame, an old campaigner who had fought side by side with Clovis in the wars against the Alamanni. He was called "the lame" because of a wound he had received at the Battle of Tolbiac, 496, the same year as Clovis' conversion to Catholicism. Clovis believed he had won by calling on the name of Christ and now had a mandate from God to Christianize all Neustria. This was a long process not free from resistance.

In 509 he sent a messenger to Chloderic to state that if his father, Sigobert, were to die, he, Clovis, would ally himself to Chloderic. Whatever Clovis may have meant, as Sigobert was sleeping at noon in his tent in the forest across the Rhine from Cologne after a walk, Chloderic's hired assassins killed him. Chloderic sent to Clovis offering some of Sigobert's treasury as enticement. Clovis sent messengers refusing the treasure but asked to see it. Complying with their request to sink his arms into it so that they could see how deep it was, Chloderic was dispatched by the blow of an axe, unable to defend himself.

Arriving in person Clovis assembled the citizens of Cologne, denied the murders, saying "It is not for me to shed the blood of one of my fellow kings, for that is a crime …" He advised them to place themselves under his protection, after which he was shouted into office by a voice vote and raised up on their shields in a ceremony of installation. Thus the independent kingdom of the Ripuarian Franks was voted out of existence by the people at a single assembly in 509.

Gregory says "after the death of Theudebald (ca. 555), Lothar took over the lands of the Ripuarian Franks." Evidently Theudebald had possessed them. He was the son of Theudebert, who was the son of Theuderic, a son of Clovis, as was Lothar. Clovis (died 511) had left his kingdom to his four sons, Theuderic, Chlodomer, Childebert and Lothar. Part of that inheritance was the country of the Ripuarian Franks. The fact that it was attacked by Saxons, who entered it from their own country and "laid waste as far as the city of Deutz," identifies the country around Cologne as being in their territory.

After the death of Lothar (561) his four sons inherited the kingdom jointly. Sigibert received the share formerly Theuderic's (Austrasia) and set up a capital at Rheims.

Language

There are no direct attestations of the early Frankish language. Of some 1,400 Latin inscriptions in Roman Germania Inferior a little over 100 are from the rural lands of the Germanic Ubii, into whose lands the Ripuarii would move. The inscriptions are most frequent in the 3rd century. Most are from the major cities of Germania Inferior. The right bank of the Rhine, where the Ripuarii originated, does not have such a wealth of Latin inscriptions. The High German consonant shift occurred south of an east-west zone called the Benrath Line. The Rhine crosses it in the vicinity of Düsseldorf. The section of the Rhine including Cologne forms the so-called "Rhenish Fan", where dialects are found which form intermediate stages between Dutch and High German.

Ripuarian laws

In the first half of the 7th century the Ripuarians received the Ripuarian law (Lex Ripuaria), a law code applying only to them, from the dominating Salian Franks. The Salians, following the custom of the Romans before them, were mainly re-authorizing laws already in use by the Ripuarians, so that the latter could retain their local constitution.

See also
 Franks
 Salian Franks
 List of Germanic tribes

Footnotes

References
 .
 

 
 
 Rivers, Theodore John. (1986) Laws of the Salian and Ripuarian Franks. New York: AMS Press, 1986.

External links

 
 

Early Germanic peoples
Frankish people
Franks
History of the Rhineland